The 1991 Liga Semi-Pro Divisyen 2 season is the third season of Liga Semi-Pro Divisyen 2. A total of eight teams participated in the season.

Perlis and Sarawak were relegated from 1990 Liga Semi-Pro Divisyen 1.

Under the new format, only the top six teams in Divisyen 1 and the Divisyen 2 champions and runners-up will be involved in the Malaysia Cup. Malaysia Cup was played from the quarter-final stage, scheduled for November after the league was finished. The Malaysia Cup quarter-final and semi-final matches will be played on a home and away basis.

The season kicked off on 27 April 1991. Negeri Sembilan ended up the season by winning the title.

Teams
Eight teams competing in the third season of Liga Semi-Pro Divisyen 2.

 Negeri Sembilan (1991 Liga Semi-Pro Divisyen 2 champions)
 Sarawak  (Promoted to Liga Semi-Pro Divisyen 1)
 Penang (1992 MSPFL promotion play-off)
 Police
 Perlis 
 Malacca
 Brunei
 Armed Forces

League Table:-

1.Negeri Sembilan  - 19 PTS (1991 Liga Semi-Pro Divisyen 2 champions and promoted to 1992 Liga Semi-Pro Divisyen 1)

2.Sarawak  - 18 PTS (Promoted to 1992 Liga Semi-Pro Divisyen 1)

3.Penang  - 18 PTS (1991 Liga Semi-Pro promotion play-off) (Stay)

4.Police  - 16 PTS 

5.Perlis  - 15 PTS

6.Malacca  - 10 PTS

7.Brunei  - 10 PTS

8.Armed Forces  - 6 PTS

Champions

References

Liga Semi-Pro Divisyen 2 seasons
2
Malaysia